Federico Viero (born 10 March 1999) is an Italian professional footballer who plays as a midfielder.

Career
Born in Parma, Viero started his career in local club Parma youth sector. In 2015 he joined to Sassuolo Primavera.

On 5 July 2019, he signed with Serie C club Teramo. Viero made his professional debut on 25 August 2019 against Catanzaro.

References

External links
 
 

1999 births
Living people
Sportspeople from Parma
Italian footballers
Association football midfielders
Serie C players
Parma Calcio 1913 players
U.S. Sassuolo Calcio players
S.S. Teramo Calcio players
Footballers from Emilia-Romagna